Stafford University Uganda (SUU) is a private university in Uganda that was established in 2015 after receiving a licence from the Uganda National Council for Higher Education (UNCHE).

Location
The geographical coordinates of the university campus are 0°18'12.0"N, 32°36'20.0"E (Latitude:0.303333; Longitude:32.605556).

History
In 2017, the UNCHE put the university on six months notice, and an investigation team appointed by the UNCHE recommended further investigation into the irregular graduation of over 300 students in conjunction with JOBKEY University. and finally the provisional licence of the university was Revoked on 30/Nov/18 https://unche.or.ug/

Overview
The university was established with the consent and collaboration of Stafford University in the United Kingdom. It offers courses that lead to the award of certificates, diplomas, and degrees, with study modalities that include day, evening, and weekend sessions.

Academics
As of December 2017, the university's academics were organised through the following faculties:

Faculty of Humanities and Social Sciences
The faculty is divided into the following departments, each led by a departmental head.
 Journalism & Communication Studies
 Development Studies
 Public Administration & Political Studies
 Social Work & Social Administration
 Sociology & Psychology

Faculty of Business & Management
The following academic courses are offered in this faculty:

 Master of Business Administration (MBA) (generic)
 MBA in marketing
 MBA accounting and finance
 MBA in entrepreneurship
 MBA in human resource management
 MBA in project management and practice
 MBA in business finance and economics
 Postgraduate diploma in business administration

Faculty of Science & Technology
The following academic courses are offered in this faculty:
 Bachelor of Information Technology
 Bachelor of Science in computer science
 Bachelor of Science in public health

See also
 List of universities in Uganda

References

External links
Website of Stafford University Uganda
Ranking of Universities in Uganda At Webometrics.info

Universities and colleges in Uganda
Central Region, Uganda
Educational institutions established in 2015
2015 establishments in Uganda
Makindye Division